Tony Chursky (born June 13, 1953 in New Westminster, British Columbia, Canada) is a former Canadian national soccer team and NASL goalkeeper.

Playing career 
Chursky grew up in Vancouver, British Columbia and attended Simon Fraser University where he graduated with a degree in English Literature. He is of Ukrainian descent.

He joined the Seattle Sounders of the North American Soccer League (NASL) in 1976 and finished with the league's best record for goalkeepers.  Despite that, he did not gain any official recognition, whether as an All Star or Rookie of the Year.  Chursky played three seasons for the Seattle Sounders before being traded to the California Surf for Al Trost in January 1979.  The Surf turned around and traded him to the Chicago Sting later that season.  In and finally the Toronto Blizzard.  He played in 145 NASL regular season games and 11 play off games including Soccer Bowl 1977 against the New York Cosmos.  Despite his outstanding career, Chursky will be remembered by many for the mistake which led to the Cosmos first goal over the Sounders in Pele's August 1977 final match.  Chursky saved a shot, then put the ball on the ground and began dribbling towards his goal.  Cosmos forward Steve Hunt rushed at Chursky who, due to being deaf in one ear, did not hear his teammates' cries.  Hunt stole the ball, dribbled it towards the Seattle goal, pursued by Chursky, and scored the game's first goal.  The Sounders tied the score before halftime.  Giorgio Chinaglia then scored to win the game for the Cosmos in the second half. The Sounders best chance to tie was a low shot from super-sub Steve Buttle, which went wide right.

Chursky played MISL pro indoor soccer for at least two seasons with the Tacoma Stars.

International career 
Chursky made an impressive debut in goal for Canada against Poland on 1 August 1973 in Toronto in a 1–3 defeat while still an unknown amateur. He would go on to earn 19 caps with the national team. Chursky's final cap came on 14 October 1981 against Guadeloupe in Pointe-à-Pitre in a 2–1 victory. He replaced Tino Lettieri at half time.

Chursky also was a member of the Canadian squad at the 1975 Pan American Games.

Personal life 
His son Alex Chursky is current Assistant Coach at Seattle University Athletics and was member of the  Canada U-20 men's national soccer team.

Writing Career 
In 2019 he co-authored Sounders Together; Friends Forever with his friend and Seattle Sounders team mate, Adrian Webster

References

External links 
 / Canada Soccer Hall of Fame
 NASL/MISL stats

1953 births
Living people
Soccer people from British Columbia
California Surf players
Canadian educators
Canadian expatriate sportspeople in the United States
Canadian expatriate soccer players
Canada men's international soccer players
Canada Soccer Hall of Fame inductees
Canadian soccer players
Canadian people of Ukrainian descent
Chicago Sting (NASL) players
Expatriate soccer players in the United States
Association football goalkeepers
Footballers at the 1975 Pan American Games
Pan American Games competitors for Canada
Major Indoor Soccer League (1978–1992) players
North American Soccer League (1968–1984) indoor players
North American Soccer League (1968–1984) players
Sportspeople from New Westminster
Seattle Sounders (1974–1983) players
Simon Fraser Clan men's soccer players
Tacoma Stars players
Toronto Blizzard (1971–1984) players
Vancouver Spartans players